Red Lights is a 2012 Spanish-American supernatural thriller film written and directed by Rodrigo Cortés and starring Cillian Murphy, Sigourney Weaver, Robert De Niro, Toby Jones, Joely Richardson, and Elizabeth Olsen. The plot focuses on a physicist (Murphy) and a university psychology professor (Weaver), both of whom specialise in debunking supernatural phenomena, and their attempt at discrediting a renowned psychic (De Niro) whose greatest critic mysteriously died 30 years prior.

The film premiered at the Sundance Film Festival in January 2012, and received a limited release in the United States on 13 July 2012.

Plot 
The film opens with two primary characters: university professor and psychologist Margaret Matheson (Sigourney Weaver), who investigates claims of paranormal phenomena, and her assistant Tom Buckley (Cillian Murphy), a physicist. The audience is provided with an insight into the world of the opening section's primary characters while concurrently observing the public reemergence of a psychic, Simon Silver (Robert De Niro).

The ending of the film's first half is signified by the sudden death of Matheson from a chronic vascular condition at the same time as one of Silver's comeback performances takes place, an incident that is particularly significant because Matheson was a former nemesis of Silver, a skeptic who investigated the psychic's work, under similar circumstances. Matheson also had a previous encounter with Silver, when he had, for an instant, got the best of her by bringing up the subject of her son's spirit (her son was in a vegetative coma and on life support). Matheson agrees only to appear on a televised panel in anticipation of Silver's return. Prior to her death, Matheson refuses to cooperate with Buckley's insistent call to undertake another investigation of Silver, warning Buckley against such an undertaking due to her previous experience with the psychic.

However, following Matheson's death, the assistant becomes increasingly obsessed with investigating Silver for the purpose of exposing the popular psychic as a fraud. During Buckley's efforts to reveal Silver's large-scale trickery, a series of inexplicable events occurs—electronic devices explode, dead birds appear, and Buckley's laboratory is vandalized. Buckley's paranoia intensifies, as he believes Silver is behind these incidents. Buckley's calm and rational disposition eventually degenerates into an obsessiveness that resembles the late Matheson's intense antipathy to paranormal claims. As part of the introduction to the climactic section of the film, Silver agrees to participate in an investigation proposed by an academic from the same university that Matheson was employed by, and Buckley joins the observation team for the tests.

In the final moments of the film, Buckley's assistants manage to reveal the manner in which Silver defrauds the public through a close analysis of the test footage accumulated by Buckley from the university's investigation. At the same time, Buckley exposes Silver at one of the psychic's public performances, and Silver is left dumbfounded. Buckley then reveals to the viewer that he actually possesses paranormal abilities and has been responsible for the inexplicable incidents that have occurred during his investigation of Silver. In a letter to his late mentor, Buckley explains a realization in which he arrives at an understanding that his decision to work with Matheson, despite the possibility of loftier career opportunities as a physicist, was the result of an unconscious attempt to seek others like himself; the revelation clarifies that Buckley's choices were made in spite of his conscious denial of the existence of paranormal activity (such denial is touched on earlier in the film, whereby the character implies that he chose this career because his mother was delayed from seeking critical medical treatment due to advice from a fraud psychic - [we don't know that for sure. Later on he tells Matheson that his mother is actually a housewife]). The letter to Matheson ends with regret that Buckley denied her the consolation of knowing that there is something more, and that now she deserved even more, "everything". Buckley then turns off the life-support machine that is keeping Matheson's son alive. He then walks out of the hospital and concludes his letter to the deceased Matheson: "You can't deny yourself forever."

Cast 
 Cillian Murphy as Thomas "Tom" Buckley
 Sigourney Weaver as Margaret Matheson
 Robert De Niro as Simon Silver
 Joely Richardson as Monica Handsen
 Elizabeth Olsen as Sally Owen
 Craig Roberts as Ben
 Toby Jones as Dr Paul Shackleton
 Burn Gorman as Benedict Cosell
 Garrick Hagon as Howard McColm 
 Leonardo Sbaraglia as Leonardo "Leo" Palladino
 Lynn Blades as Dana
 Jeany Spark as Traci Northrop
 Julius Cotter as Dr. Jennings

Production

Development 
Cortés spent a year and a half researching and writing the screenplay, studying both sides of the psychic powers issue offered by skeptics and believers. He came to the conclusion that some on each side exclude evidence that does not support their position. He further stated that he does not intend Red Lights to represent his own position on the subject, as it is just an entertainment movie; however, he personally does not believe in the supernatural (ghosts, demons, etc.) because, in his view, nothing can exceed natural laws, but the paranormal (psychic powers, etc.), which he differentiates from the supernatural, could be phenomena in some cases for which science has yet to find an explanation.

He scripted the character of skeptical psychologist Margaret Matheson specifically with actress Sigourney Weaver in mind for the role, but with no advance commitment from her, though to his relief, she did sign on to the project after reading the script.

Robert De Niro researched and met with psychics for his role and developed the cautious belief that there is something to the phenomenon based on allegedly psychically-obtained information they were able to tell him that he insists only he knew: "There's no way they could have known certain things and they said them, so in that sense, I have no answer than to say that I have to believe that there's something there that they pick up psychically. I don't know what it is".

Filming 
Filming occurred in Spain and Canada, with ten of the filming locations based in Barcelona, Spain; a week of filming was undertaken at the Fairmont Royal York in Toronto, Canada and significant shots were taken on James Street North in nearby Hamilton, Canada. The filming process for Red Lights commenced in February 2011 and concluded in April 2011.

Release

Critical reception 

Red Lights received mainly negative reviews from critics. The review aggregator website Rotten Tomatoes reported that 30% of critics have given the film a positive review based on 92 reviews, with an average rating of 4.85/10. The site's critics consensus reads, "Wasting the talents of an impressive cast on a predictable mystery, Red Lights lacks the clairvoyance to know what audiences want." On Metacritic, the film has a weighted average score of 36 out of 100 based on 22 critics, indicating "generally unfavorable reviews".

References

External links 
 
 
 
 How true to life are the psychics and psychologists in Red Lights? The Guardian, June 15, 2012. A review of the film by real-life parapsychologist Chris French

2012 films
2012 psychological thriller films
2012 thriller drama films
2010s mystery drama films
2010s mystery thriller films
2010s psychological drama films
2010s supernatural thriller films
American mystery drama films
American mystery thriller films
American psychological drama films
American psychological thriller films
American supernatural thriller films
English-language Spanish films
Films directed by Rodrigo Cortés
Films shot in Barcelona
Films shot in Toronto
Paranormal films
Spanish mystery drama films
Spanish mystery thriller films
Spanish supernatural films
Spanish thriller drama films
Nostromo Pictures films
2010s English-language films
2010s American films
2010s Spanish films
Spanish psychological thriller films